Good for You may refer to:

 Good for You (album), by Aminé, 2017
 "Good for You" (song), by Selena Gomez featuring ASAP Rocky, 2015
 Good for You (TV series), a 2013 South Korean teledrama
 Good for You, a 1984 album by Prelude
 "Good for You", a song from the 2015 musical Dear Evan Hansen
 "Good for You", a song by Icona Pop from their 2012 self-titled album
 "Good for You", a 1996 song by Seiko Matsuda
 "Good for You", a song from the TV series Smash
 "Good for You", a song by Soul Asylum from their 2006 album The Silver Lining
 "Good for You", a 2019 song by Spacey Jane
 "Good for You", a song by Third Eye Blind from their 1997 self-titled album
 "Good for You", a song by Toto from their 1982 album Toto IV

See also
 "Good 4 U", a 2021 song by Olivia Rodrigo
 Good for Me (disambiguation)